Maksim Andreyevich Dmitriyev (born 25 June 2001) is a Russian football player. He plays for FC Znamya Noginsk.

Club career
He made his debut in the Russian Football National League for FC Tom Tomsk on 22 August 2020 in a game against FC Dynamo Bryansk.

References

External links
 
 Profile by Russian Football National League
 

2001 births
People from Prokopyevsk
Sportspeople from Kemerovo Oblast
Living people
Russian footballers
Association football forwards
FC Tom Tomsk players
FC SKA-Khabarovsk players
Russian First League players
Russian Second League players